Chenar Pakaneh (also Romanized as Chenār Pākaneh) is a village in Hana Rural District, Abadeh Tashk District, Neyriz County, Fars Province, Iran. At the 2006 census, its population was 33, in 5 families.

References 

Populated places in Abadeh Tashk County